Dal Soon's Spring is a 2017 South Korea morning soap opera starring Hong Ah-reum, Yun Da-yeong, Song Won-seok, and Kang Dal-bin. It aired on KBS2 from August 14, 2017 on Mondays to Fridays at 09:00 (KST) to 09:45 (KST).

It is the 43rd TV Novel series (12th in 2010s) of KBS. The time setting of this drama is among the earliest compared to the other series, starting years before the Pacific War in the Korean independence movement era.

Plot 
The story of an amnesiac young woman to become a successful shoemaker while also searching for her identity and get the justice for her father's death.

Cast

Main 
 Hong Ah-reum as Go Dal-soon / Han Eun-sol
 Uhm Chae-young as young Go Dal-soon / Han Eun-sol
 Yun Da-yeong as Han Hong-joo / Go Jung-ok 
 Choi Myung-bin as young Han Hong-joo / Go Jung-ok 
 Song Won-seok as Jung Yoon-jae
 Gil Jung-woo as young Jung Yoon-jae
 Kang Dal-bin as Seo Hyun-do
 Choi Kwon-soo as young Seo Hyun-do

Supporting

Song-in Shoe 
 Im Ho as Han Tae-sung
 Park Hyun-jung as Song Yeon-hwa
 Kim Min-hee as Han Tae-sook
 Park Ji-hoon as Dong-hoon

Hangang Leather 
 Choi Jae-sung as Jung Sun-ki
 Jo Eun-sook as Seo Mi-ryung
 Hong Il-kwon as Seo Bong-sik
 Lee Min-ji as Seo Hyun-jung

People around Boon-yi 
 Kim Young-ok as Kang Boon-yi
 Bae Do-hwan as Jung Chong-ki
 Choi Wan-jung as Ahn Choo-ja
 Jung Ha-yoon as Jung Bok-nam

Cameo appearance 
 Jung Young-sook as Choi Geum-seon
 Choi Cheol-ho as Lee Jae-ha

Ratings 
In this table, The blue numbers represent the lowest ratings and the red numbers represent the highest ratings.
NR denotes that the drama did not rank in the top 20 daily programs on that date.

Awards and nominations

References

External links
  

Korean Broadcasting System television dramas
Korean-language television shows
2017 South Korean television series debuts
2018 South Korean television series endings